Wajahat Khan (also known as Vajahat Khan; IAST: Wajāhat Khān, Hindi: वजाहत  ख़ान, Bengali: ওয়াজাহাত খান, Urdu: خان وجاہت,) is an Indian sarod player and composer who has earned international acclaim since 1977. He is the third son and disciple of sitar and surbahar player Imrat Khan, nephew of sitar player Vilayat Khan and a member of India's illustrious multi-generational musical Khan family which founded the Imdadkhani Gharana . He was born in the mid-1960s in Calcutta, India and now divides his time between London and India.

Career

Khan started his training in singing, sitar and surbahar from the age of 3, and his professional career in music as a child prodigy singer touring the world at a young age, including a performance on BBC Television in 1977. In his early teens, he decided to specialise in sarod, marking an interesting departure from his family's traditional instruments of sitar and surbahar.

He has performed extensively around the world, touring in the Indian sub-continent, UK, Europe, Scandinavia, USA, former USSR, Africa, Middle-East, South-East Asia and the Far-East. His performances at prestigious venues and festivals include the Kremlin in Moscow, the Acropolis of Athens, the Smithsonian Institution in Washington D.C., Symphony Space in New York, Suntory Hall in Tokyo, Playhouse Theatre in Durban, the Glastonbury Festival and the Royal Albert Hall for the BBC Proms Festival in the UK.

Whilst mainly focussing on performing traditional Indian classical music, he has also ventured into crossover as a distinguished composer, having written pioneering works for Indian as well as Western instruments and ensembles, including three sarod concertos for symphony and chamber orchestras and quintets for sarod and string quartets. In 1991 he wrote and performed his first sarod concerto in Germany and has since performed with renowned international orchestras and ensembles such as the London Sinfonietta and Halle Symphony Orchestra (UK), Cape Philharmonic and KwaZulu Natal Symphony Orchestra (South Africa) and the Singapore Symphony Orchestra.  In 1997 he composed for and recorded his first quartet for sarod and string quartet with the Medici String Quartet, and has since performed with leading quartets such as the Carducci String Quartet, Ciurlionis String Quartet, and the Allegri String Quartet. He has toured internationally on several occasions with his Wajahat Khan World Music Ensemble, which includes the renowned flamenco/jazz guitarist Eduardo Niebla.

His collaborations also include the Brit Award winning rock band Kula Shaker, Japanese Shakuhachi maestro Yoshikazu Iwamoto and Indian shehnai player Ali Ahmad Khan, with whom he recorded the first ever sarod and shehnai duet. In 1997, on the occasion of the 50th year of Indian Independence Wajahat Khan also created for the first time in history a unique ensemble of soloists, consisting solely of all the traditional instruments and percussion that are at the forefront of North Indian classical music scene today – the Wajahat Khan Indian Chamber Orchestra. This was premiered to great acclaim at the Queen Elizabeth Hall in London and subsequent performances have included Huddersfield Contemporary Music Festival (UK). In 2008 he premiered his third sarod concerto to a standing ovation with the Halle Symphony Orchestra for the 150th year celebration of the Halle, at the prestigious Bridgewater Hall in Manchester and also composed, performed and toured another unique opera 'Queens of Govan' with the Scottish Opera.

Khan also teaches and lectures internationally and has given concerts and workshop courses at eminent institutions, such as the University of Florida, University of Maryland, Utica University, Amherst College, Washington University in St Louis and Augustana College in the USA; the University of Malaysia in Kuala Lumpur; the Birmingham Conservatoire, Manchester and Brighton Universities, Yehudi Menuhin School of Music, Trinity College of Music and Morley College in the UK.  In London, he is the Founder Director of his own Academy of World Music, and has been Artist in Residence at the Middlesex University and SOAS, University of London, where he is also working on a book about Indian music in live performance. He performs and gives lecture demonstrations at various educational institutions of Spicmacay throughout India. He has given illustrated talks on television and radio introducing and explaining Indian music, most notably presenting a highly acclaimed series of programmes for the BBC World Service.

Style

Khan has energised the sarod performance repertoire with the intricate and fluid musical styles evolved by generations of his family, as well as a wide range of world music collaborations. Whilst preserving the ancient traditions, he brings his own innovations to the styles and techniques of the sarod, including his pioneering adaptation of the four-string technique of the surbahar to the sarod, thereby adding new dimensions to the instrument. Adding a fifth melody string for the base, he uniquely uses seven pegs on the head of his instrument, instead of the conventional six or eight pegs used by other contemporary masters. His distinctive style on the sarod and virtuoso technique interweaves a wide spectrum of dhrupad, khayāl and ṭhumrī (vocal) forms with the sarod instrumental repertoires.

Discography
His CDs include:
 Nocturne: Late Evening Raga of Romantic Mood (2003)
 Indian Raags for Sarod, Tabla and Tanpura (2001)
 Rag Yaman Kalyan/Rag Gaoti(1996)
 Raag Desh/Shivranjani (2000)
 Raag Alaiya Bilawal (1987)
 Raag Desh (2002)
 Maru Behag/Dhun
 Tilak Kamod/Pilu
 Jhinjhoti/Pilu
 Brindabani Sarang
 The Quest: Khamboji/Khammaj

References

External links
 Wajahat Khan's website
 Rupert Mayr, Indian virtuosos delight music lovers, The Herald, April 12, 2006 – concert review (South Africa)
 “Marriage of Two Great Musical Cultures”, The LCMS Newsletter 9 (2014)

Hindustani instrumentalists
Indian male composers
Sarod players
Living people
Etawah gharana
Musicians from Kolkata